Pirprofen was a nonsteroidal anti-inflammatory drug (NSAID) that was brought to market by Ciba-Geigy in 1982 as a treatment for arthritis and pain.   Its label was restricted after adverse events arose, including some cases of fatal liver toxicity.   Ciba-Geigy voluntarily withdrew the drug from the market worldwide in 1990.

References

Propionic acids
Hepatotoxins
Nonsteroidal anti-inflammatory drugs
Pyrrolines
Chloroarenes